Bhuteshwar railway station is on the Agra–Delhi chord .  It is located in Mathura district in the Indian state of Uttar Pradesh. It serves the suburban areas of Mathura.It is nearby to Sri Krishna Janmbhoomi and Bhuteshwar Mahadev Temple.

History
The broad gauge Agra–Delhi chord was opened in 1904. This railway station was built so as to manage short route trains. The name of this station was on Bhuteshwar Mahadev Temple. In the back days there was a huge mound called as "Bhuteshwar Tilla"

Electrification
The Faridabad–Mathura–Agra section was electrified in 1982–85.

Passengers
Bhuteshwar railway station serves around 36,000 passengers monthly

References

External links
 Trains at Bhuteshwar

Railway stations in Mathura district
Agra railway division